Mehboob Ki Mehndi is a 1971 Indian Hindi-language romantic musical film produced and directed by H. S. Rawail. The film stars Rajesh Khanna and Leena Chandavarkar. The music is by Laxmikant Pyarelal with lyrics by Anand Bakshi. It was based on Muslim Tahzeeb (culture) of the bygone Nawab era, wherein the a young rich Muslim man Yusuf agrees to marry a prostitute's daughter. The movie was released on 30 January 1971. It showed the importance of education in Muslims as preached by Mahatma Gandhi. Shabana, the heroine is able to save herself, and her family, only by educating herself and doing the job of tutor. Rajesh Khanna was the co-producer. Although the film popularly counted among the 17 consecutive hit films of Rajesh Khanna between 1969 and 1971, but the Box Office record cites, the movie was flop commercially.

Cast
Rajesh Khanna as Yusuf
Leena Chandavarkar as Shabana
Pradeep Kumar as Anwar Kamaal/ Khairuddin 'Khairu'
Sunder as Hakim Sahab: Gulkand's father
Iftekhar as Nawab Safdarjung
Manorama as tutor Mrs. Albert
Paro as Naani
Master Kishore as child Firangi
Jagdish Raj as Nisaar Ahmed/ Usmaan
Farooque 'Kartoos' as Moonhbole
Gurnam Singh (as Gurnam)
Mumtaz Begum or Badi Mumtaz as Shabana's grandmother
Kamal Kapoor as Public Prosecutor

Plot
The film starts with Shabana performing at a singing competition in her college. She lives with her foster grandmother/ nanny in Bombay, while her mother, Najma stays away from her in Hyderabad with her exploitative partner, Nisaar Ahmed, who is a pimp. He forces Najma to live the life of a prostitute. However, Najma doesn't tell her daughter about this and Shabana doesn't have any idea about her mother's miserable life. One day, she is back from her college after winning a singing competition. Shabana is expecting her mother to visit within 2–3 days, but the doorbell rings and the postman comes with a telegram, which comes from Hyderabad, informing her of her mother's illness. She goes to Hyderabad with her nanny where she finds out the truth. When her mother learns of this, she kills herself. In fact, it was Nisaar who had sent the telegram to trick Shabana into coming to Hyderabad because now, he wants to use her for prostitution as her mother is past her prime. But her grandmother cleverly saves her and takes her to Lucknow, where her foster brother stays. When they come to her brother's house, they learn that he died recently. His foster son (interestingly named Moonhbole which means Foster) is happy to welcome them into the house. The next day, the young and handsome Yusuf, son of a wealthy royal Nawab Safdarjung who is physically handicapped and uses a wheelchair, comes to Shabana's house. He mistakes Shabana for her cousin Moonhbole as she sleeps under a coverlet and whacks her bottom. As she wakes and screams in fear, Yusuf is mesmerised by her beauty and at the same time, both are confused. Yusuf learns about Shabana from her cousin. He has an impish little nephew nicknamed Firangi (which means foreigner). Firangi's tutor, tired of his mischievous behaviour, throws up her job after he sets a white mouse upon her at Yusuf's instigation. Yusuf then arranges to bring Shabana as the new teacher.

One night, Yusuf discovers a thief in his bedroom. But the elderly man Khairuddin's honesty and well spoken nature impresses him so much that he appoints him as caretaker to his old father, the nawab. However, the thief Khairuddin (Nawab Anwar Kamaal in the garb of a servant) had arrived there with the intention of killing Yusuf owing to an old enmity with his father, the nawab. It was later revealed that Khairuddin's father (Murad) was Nawab Sajjad Hussain whose wealth and family home was seized by Safdarjung 18 years ago, after he was unable to repay a debt. It was also revealed that Khairuddin had served life imprisonment for killing Najma's step-uncle after she was kicked out of her house on the suspicion that she was going to give birth to an illegitimate child.

Shabana and Yusuf gradually fall in love. Nawab Safdarjung is happy with the relationship and starts arranging their marriage. Just before their wedding, Shabana gives Khairu a letter which was addressed to Yusuf, revealing that she was the daughter of a courtesan named Najma. Khairu, after reading it, realises she is his daughter by Najma. Upon learning of the impending marriage, Nisaar arrives as a servant named Usman to blackmail Shabana into returning to the brothel. He threatens to reveal her mother's background to Yusuf and his family and disgrace them in society and consequently get the wedding called off. He demands she hand over all her jewellery and money in Yusuf's house to him. He also tries to molest her at gunpoint but she tricks him to snatch his pistol and fatally shoots him. Khairu arrives after hearing her scream and in order to protect her, shoots Nisaar repeatedly as everyone rushed into the room. The real truth about Khairu and Yusuf's fathers and real relationships are revealed by Yusuf in the ensuing murder trial after he finds two letters in Khairu's room. One was from Khairu to Safdarjung in which Khairu takes responsibility for killing Yusuf as revenge and the other one was the letter from Shabana to Yusuf, torn to bits by Khairu, which contained the truth about her background. In a happy ending, Yusuf and Shabana get married. The film closes with the mischievous nephew Firangi intruding upon the newlyweds' boudoir.

Soundtrack

All the songs were composed by Laxmikant Pyarelal and lyrics were penned by Anand Bakshi.

References

External links
 

1971 films
1970s Hindi-language films
1971 romantic drama films
Indian romantic drama films
Films directed by H. S. Rawail